San Pascual, officially the Municipality of San Pascual,  is a 1st class municipality in the province of Batangas, Philippines. According to the 2020 census, it has a population of 69,009 making it as the 9th most populous municipality in the province.

The municipality borders Bauan on the west, Alitagtag and San Jose on the north, and Batangas City on the east.

History

Separation from Bauan

Historically, San Pascual was a part of Bauan and was referred to as "Lagnas." San Pascual became a separate municipality in 1969 due to Mayor Leonardo "Leoning" Mendoza's tenacious leadership. The name "Lagnas", which refers to the municipality's location physically between the Lagnas and Hagonoy Rivers, is derived from the local dialect and means "river boundaries."

Religious attributions

The religious populace and congregation therefore changed the name of the Lagnas neighborhood to San Pascual De Baylon in honor of the Roman Catholic saint. It was thought that naming a location after one of its patron saints would bring luck and a prosperous future. As a result, somewhere around 1959, the San Pascual neighborhood became the Parish of San Pascual de Baylon, with the aforementioned saint serving as its Patron Saint.

Government

Local government
The municipal mayor is in charge of the municipality and serves as the head of the local government. The vice mayor serves as the mayor's deputy. Regarding the local legislature. The Sangguniang Bayan serves as the municipality's local legislature. The vice mayor serves as its president, and the council is made up of eight "councillors."

Representative

San Pascual is in the Batangas's 2nd congressional district. Gerville Luistro (Lakas-CMD) is the current representative of the 2nd district, succeeding Raneo Abu (NP).

Geography

According to the Philippine Statistics Authority, the municipality has a land area of  constituting  of the  total area of Batangas.

Barangays
San Pascual is politically subdivided into 29 barangays.

Climate

Demographics

In the 2020 census, San Pascual had a population of 69,009.

Economy

As one of the towns adjacent to the province's capital, it is a bustling town full of businesses and establishments.

The town is home to an oil refinery, chemical plants and various subdivisions and housing projects, as well as other industrial and commercial establishments.

Hospitals
 Saint Pascal De Baylon Hospital
 San Antonio Life Care Hospital

Education
There are numerous elementary and high schools, offering primary and secondary education in the town of San Pascual. The most known high school in the municipality is the San Pascual National High School.

Gallery

References

External links

[ Philippine Standard Geographic Code]

Municipalities of Batangas